Potassium-40 (40K) is a radioactive isotope of potassium which has a long half-life of 1.25 billion years. It makes up about 0.012% (120 ppm) of the total amount of potassium found in nature.

Potassium-40 undergoes three types of radioactive decay. In about 89.28% of events, it decays to calcium-40 (40Ca) with emission of a beta particle (β−, an electron) with a maximum energy of 1.31 MeV and an antineutrino. In about 10.72% of events, it decays to argon-40 (40Ar) by electron capture (EC), with the emission of a neutrino and then a 1.460 MeV gamma ray. The radioactive decay of this particular isotope explains the large abundance of argon (nearly 1%) in the Earth's atmosphere, as well as prevalence of 40Ar over other isotopes. Very rarely (0.001% of events), it decays to 40Ar by emitting a positron (β+) and a neutrino.

Potassium–argon dating

Potassium-40 is especially important in potassium–argon (K–Ar) dating. Argon is a gas that does not ordinarily combine with other elements. So, when a mineral forms – whether from molten rock, or from substances dissolved in water – it will be initially argon-free, even if there is some argon in the liquid. However, if the mineral contains any potassium, then decay of the 40K isotope present will create fresh argon-40 that will remain locked up in the mineral. Since the rate at which this conversion occurs is known, it is possible to determine the elapsed time since the mineral formed by measuring the ratio of 40K and 40Ar atoms contained in it.

The argon found in Earth's atmosphere is 99.6% 40Ar; whereas the argon in the Sun – and presumably in the primordial material that condensed into the planets – is mostly 36Ar, with less than 15% of 38Ar. It follows that most of the terrestrial argon derives from potassium-40 that decayed into argon-40, which eventually escaped to the atmosphere.

Contribution to natural radioactivity

The radioactive decay of 40K in the Earth's mantle ranks third, after 232Th and 238U, as the source of radiogenic heat.  The core also likely contains radiogenic sources, although how much is uncertain.  It has been proposed that significant core radioactivity (1–2 TW) may be caused by high levels of U, Th, and K.

Potassium-40 is the largest source of natural radioactivity in animals including humans. A 70 kg human body contains about 140 grams of potassium, hence about 0.000117 × 140 = 0.0164 grams of 40K; whose decay produces about 3,850 to 4,300 disintegrations per second (becquerel) continuously throughout the life of the body.

Banana equivalent dose

Potassium-40 is famous for its usage in the banana equivalent dose, an informal unit of measurement, primarily used in generalized educational settings, to compare radioactive dosages to the amount received by consuming one banana. The radioactive dosage from consuming one banana is generally agreed to be 10−7 sievert, or 0.1 microsievert, which is 1% of the average American's daily radioactive intake.

See also
 Background radiation
 Isotopes of potassium

Notes

References
Table of radioactive isotopes, K-40
The Lund/LBNL Nuclear Data Search

External links
 Potassium-40 Section, Radiological and Chemical Fact Sheets to Support Health Risk Analyses for Contaminated Areas

Isotopes of potassium
Element toxicology
Positron emitters
Radionuclides used in radiometric dating